Toledo Islamic Academy (TIA) is a primary and secondary private Islamic charter school in Toledo, Ohio, enrolling students in grades PK–12. It was established in 1995 by the Masjid Saad Foundation, and is accredited by the Ohio Department of Education and AdvancEd.

The school follows Common Core State Standards in its college-preparatory curriculum, with a focus on STEM education. Students study Arabic as a second language in addition to English, and participate in Quran studies in Arabic.

In 2007, the Masjid Saad mosque, where the school had been holding classes since it opened in September 1995, relocated along with the school to the former Cathedral of Praise church in Sylvania, Ohio. The new facility included a gym, playground areas, and a cafeteria.

In 2015, there were 183 students enrolled with a 100% four-year graduation rate, and 100% of students later attending 4-year colleges. Their average ACT score was 23.0, and average SAT score was 2030.

, the school principal is Dr. Nabila Gomaa.

References

External links
 Official website

Islam in Ohio
Islamic schools in Ohio
Educational institutions established in 1995
High schools in Lucas County, Ohio
Private high schools in Ohio
Private middle schools in Ohio
Private elementary schools in Ohio
1995 establishments in Ohio